The 2011 Istanbul GP3 Series round was the first round of the 2011 GP3 Series season. It was held on May 6–8, 2011 at Istanbul Speed Park, Istanbul, Turkey, supporting the 2011 Turkish Grand Prix.

Classification

Race 1

Race 2

Standings after the round

Drivers' Championship standings

Teams' Championship standings

 Note: Only the top five positions are included for both sets of standings.

See also 
 2011 Turkish Grand Prix
 2011 Istanbul Park GP2 Series round

References

External links
 GP3 Series official web site: Results

Istanbul Park
Istanbul Park GP3 Series round
Auto races in Turkey
Sport in Istanbul
International sports competitions hosted by Turkey
May 2011 sports events in Turkey